The Malawi national under-17 football team is the national under-17 football team of Malawi and is controlled by the Football Association of Malawi.

Current squad
 The following players were called up for the 2023 Africa U-17 Cup of Nations qualification matches.
 Match dates: 2, 4, 6 and 9 December 2022

Competitive record

FIFA U-17 World Cup record

Africa U-17 Cup of Nations record

References

External links
 Malawi FA

Malawi national football team
African national under-17 association football teams